Issum is a municipality in the district of Kleve, in North Rhine-Westphalia, Germany.

Economy 

Issum is home to the Diebels brewery, the largest altbier brewery in the world.

Notable natives 
 Isabell Werth (born 1969), German equestrian
 Peter Wollny (born 1961), German musicologist

References

External links

 Official site 

Kleve (district)